G. neglecta may refer to:
 Godinotia neglecta, an extinct lemur-like prosimian species that lived during the Eocene epoch
 Gratiola neglecta, the clammy hedgehyssop, a plant species

See also
 Neglecta (disambiguation)